Kanni may refer to:

Kanni, dog breed found in the Indian state of Tamil Nadu

Places
Myanmar
Kanni, Banmauk
Kanni, Kalewa
Kanni I, Kyain Seikgyi
Kanni II, Kyain Seikgyi